Megachic: Best of Chic a.k.a. Best Of Chic, Vol. 1 is a compilation album of recordings by the American R&B band Chic, issued by Atlantic Records/Warner Music in 1990, including the single release "Megachic Medley". It was re-issued on CD in 2005.

Track listing
All tracks written by Bernard Edwards and Nile Rodgers unless otherwise noted.
"Megachic Medley: Le Freak/Everybody Dance/Good Times/I Want Your Love"  - 7:30
 Original versions appear on albums Chic (1977), C'est Chic (1978) & Risqué (1979)
"Dance, Dance, Dance (Yowsah, Yowsah, Yowsah)" (Edwards, Rodgers, Lehman) - 8:30
 From 1977 album Chic
"Chic Cheer"  - 4:42
 From 1978 album C'est Chic
"My Feet Keep Dancing"  - 6:46
 From 1979 album Risqué
"Good Times"  - 8:13
 From 1979 album Risqué
"I Want Your Love" (7" Edit)  - 3:28
 Original version appears on 1978 album C'est Chic
"Everybody Dance"  (12" Mix)  - 8:25
 Original version appears on 1977 album Chic
"Le Freak" (7" Edit)  – 3:32
 Original version appears on 1978 album C'est Chic

Production
 Bernard Edwards - producer for Chic Organization Ltd.
 Nile Rodgers - producer for Chic Organization Ltd.
 Bert Bevans - mixer, track 1
 Jimmy Polo - keyboards (additional), track 1
 Ian Grimble - sound engineer, track 1
 Kerry Hopwood - programmer, track 1

Chic (band) compilation albums
Albums produced by Nile Rodgers
Albums produced by Bernard Edwards
2000 greatest hits albums